"Katchi" is a song by French DJ duo Ofenbach with vocals by Nick Waterhouse. It is a remix of Waterhouse's original song. It was released on 25 August 2017. The song peaked at number one on the French Singles Chart.

Charts

Weekly charts

Year-end charts

Certifications

References

2017 singles
2017 songs
Ofenbach (DJs) songs
SNEP Top Singles number-one singles